James Isaacson (born 7 January 1980 in Easington, County Durham) is an English former rugby union footballer who played in the 1990s and 2000s. He played at club level for Newcastle Falcons and Leeds Carnegie, as a Prop, or Hooker. He was educated at Durham School, Northumbria University and Life University.

Rugby career
Isaacson is an England Under 21 international, and in 1998 joined Newcastle Falcons. He remained at the club until 2005 when he was signed by Leeds Tykes, (Yorkshire Carnegie from 2014). He remained with Leeds for two seasons and was part of the squad that saw the club promoted to the Premiership. He left Leeds at the end of 2007. Isaacson was Head Coach of Life University from 2010 to 2013 predominantly in the US Super League. Whilst with Life they made the Super League Final (2011), Elite Cup Final (2012, 2013) and D1 Cup Final (2013) winning the latter. Dr. Isaacson graduated from Life University in March 2014 and currently practices in Randolph, New Jersey.

Notes

1980 births
Living people
English rugby union players
Newcastle Falcons players
Leeds Tykes players
Rugby union players from Easington, County Durham
People educated at Durham School
Alumni of Northumbria University
English expatriate sportspeople in the United States
English rugby union coaches
Life University alumni